Clan Fletcher is a Scottish clan. The clan is officially recognized by the Lord Lyon King of Arms; however, as the clan does not currently have a chief recognized by the Lord Lyon, it is considered an armigerous clan.

History

Origins of the name
The name Fletcher is derived from the French word flechier, which means arrow maker. The name was a very common trade name, so much so that it became used in the Scottish Gaelic language as fleisdear. In the eighteenth century some families went full circle and anglicised the name from the Gaelic, Mac-an-leistear, back into Fletcher.

Origins of the clan

Sometime after the eleventh century a band of Mac-an-leistears settled in Glen Orchy, Argyll. There they became arrow makers to the Clan MacGregor. Other small groups of Mac-an-leisters settled in glens that belonged to other clans, in order to make arrows for them.

The first recorded clan chief was Angus Mac-an-leister, who was born in about 1450. However, Duncan Campbell of Glenorchy, who was in high royal favour with James VI of Scotland coveted the Mac-an-leister's lands. Campbell had royal authority to maintain a large band of armed retainers who he employed in a campaign of intimidation and violence. Campbell deliberately provoked a dispute with the Mac-an-leister chief and trumped up a murder charge against him. As a result, Mac-an-leister was compelled to sign a deed in which all of his family lands were ceded to the Campbells, and from then onwards they were only tenants in Glen Orchy.

17th century

Andrew Fletcher of Saltoun "the Patriot" was a fierce opponent of the union with England. He became MP for Haddington in 1678; however, he was forced to flee to Holland for having supported the Monmouth Rebellion against James II of England (VII of Scotland).

18th century and Jacobite risings

During the Jacobite rising of 1715 Archibald, ninth chief of the clan led the Mac-an-leisters in support of the Jacobites, as did his younger brother John during the Jacobite rising of 1745. However, during "the 45" the elder brother who was the chief, provided some men for the British-Hanoverian forces under his Campbell overlords and in doing so avoided forfeiture.

Castles
Castles owned by the Clan Fletcher have included amongst others:
Archallader House, three miles from Bridge of Orchy in Argyll, is ruinous sixteenth century tower house. The lands were held by the Fletchers but were lost to the Campbells who built the existing castle. In 1603 the castle was burnt by the MacGregors and again in 1689 by Jacobites, and was not restored.
Saltoun Hall, five miles west of Haddington, East Lothian was sold to the Fletchers in 1643, and was the seat of Andrew Fletcher of Saltoun "the Patriot".

References

See also
Scottish clan

 
Fletcher